Tsushima High School  is a high school located in Tsushima in Aichi Prefecture, Japan. It was founded in January 1900, originally as a junior high school.

References

Schools in Aichi Prefecture
High schools in Aichi Prefecture
Educational institutions established in 1900
1900 establishments in Japan